Loss of Innocence is a 1978 mini-series about the life of a man from the Great Depression to the 1970s.

References

External links

Australian television films
1978 television films
1978 films
Australian Broadcasting Corporation original programming
1970s Australian television miniseries
1978 Australian television series debuts
1978 Australian television series endings